Xavier Mercier (born 25 July 1989) is a French professional footballer who plays  as an attacking midfielder for Hungarian club Ferencváros. He has previously represented Lesquin, Guingamp (for whom he made seven appearances in Ligue 2), Beauvais, KV Kortrijk, Cercle Brugge and OH Leuven.

Career statistics

References
 Xavier Mercier at foot-national.com
 
 

1989 births
Living people
People from Alès
Sportspeople from Gard
French footballers
Footballers from Occitania (administrative region)
Association football midfielders
Ligue 2 players
Championnat National players
Championnat National 2 players
Championnat National 3 players
Belgian Pro League players
Challenger Pro League players
Nemzeti Bajnokság I players
US Lesquin players
En Avant Guingamp players
AS Beauvais Oise players
US Boulogne players
K.V. Kortrijk players
Cercle Brugge K.S.V. players
Oud-Heverlee Leuven players
Ferencvárosi TC footballers
French expatriate footballers
French expatriate sportspeople in Belgium
Expatriate footballers in Belgium
French expatriate sportspeople in Hungary
Expatriate footballers in Hungary